Salentinellidae is a family of crustaceans belonging to the order Amphipoda.

Genera:
 Parasalentinella Bou, 1971
 Salentinella Ruffo, 1947

References

Amphipoda